The Paris Open Source Summit (previously Open World Forum or Forum mondial du libre) is a non-commercial community annual event on open source innovation. It is organized in Paris, France. It is governed by a steering committee and program committee, consisting of representatives of several international organizations, associations and communities.

In 2013 it brought 200 speakers to an audience of 2200 people, from 40 countries.

References

Annual events in France